Alexandrov or Aleksandrov, Alexandroff, Aleksandrow (masculine) or Alexandrova/Aleksandrova (feminine) is a Slavic surname derived from the name Alexander and common in Bulgaria and Russia. It is shared by the following people:

Science and mathematics
Aleksandr Danilovich Aleksandrov (1912–1999), Russian mathematician, physicist, philosopher and mountaineer
Anastassia Alexandrova, Russian-American chemist
Anatoly Petrovich Alexandrov (1903–1994), Soviet/Russian physicist and academician
Ivan Alexandrov (1875-1936), Soviet engineer and academician
Pavel Alexandrov (1896–1982), Russian mathematician who introduced the Alexandrov topology
Vladimir Alexandrov, Soviet physicist

Military, government, and exploration
Aleksandr Panayotov Aleksandrov (b. 1951), Bulgarian cosmonaut
Aleksandr Pavlovich Aleksandrov (b. 1943), Russian cosmonaut
Todor Aleksandrov (1881–1924), Bulgarian revolutionary

Arts, music, and drama
Mihail Aleksandrov (1949 ~), Lithuanian-born painter who specializes in oil painting, watercolor and tempura.
Sasha Alexandrov (1980 ~), Croatian fashion and glamour photographer specialized in nudes and fetish photography.
Alexander Vasilyevich Alexandrov (1883–1946), Russian composer who wrote the musical score to the National Anthem of the Soviet Union
Anatoly Nikolayevich Alexandrov (1888-1982), Soviet composer and People's Artist of the USSR
Boris Alexandrovich Alexandrov (1905-1994), Conductor of Alexandrov Ensemble, composer, People's Artist of the USSR, and Hero of Socialist Labor
Constantin Alexandrov (1940), French actor, producer, and movie maker
Grigory Alexandrov (1903-1983), Soviet film director and script writer
Josip Murn Aleksandrov (1879–1901), Slovenian poet
Nikolay Grigoryevich Alexandrov (1870-1930), Russian actor, founding member of MKhAT
Vladimir Alexandrov (critic) (1898-1954), Soviet literary critic
Gina Alexandrov (Architect) (1975 ~), Architect and Designer specializing in mid-century modern renovations.

Other people
Aleksandar Aleksandrov (born 1975), Bulgarian footballer
Aleksandar Aleksandrov (born 1986), Bulgarian footballer
Aleksej Aleksandrov (born 1973), Belarusian chess grandmaster
Alexander Petrovich Alexandrov (1906-?), Soviet engineer and twice Hero of Socialist Labor
Ekaterina Alexandrova (born 1994), Russian tennis player
Evgeny Alexandrov (born 1982), Russian ice hockey player
Georgy Aleksandrov (1908–1961), Soviet philosopher and culture minister
Igor A Aleksandrov (1956-2001), Ukrainian journalist
Mihail Aleksandrov, (born 1989), Bulgarian footballer
Pavel Alexandrovich Alexandrov (1866-1940), Lawyer of the Russian Empire, the prosecutor, State Councillor
Stoyan Alexandrov, Bulgarian economist
Teodora Alexandrova (born 1981), Bulgarian rhythmic gymnast
Yuri Alexandrov, multiple people

References

Russian-language surnames
Bulgarian-language surnames
Patronymic surnames
Surnames from given names

lt:Aleksandrovas